Yuri Vladimirovich Mikhailis (born April 23, 1969) is a retired Kazakhstani professional ice hockey player and ice hockey coach. He is currently the head coach of Nomad Astana of the Kazakhstan Hockey Championship. His son, Nikita Mikhailis, plays for Barys Astana of the Kontinental Hockey League.

References

External links

1969 births
Living people
Sportspeople from Karaganda
Kazakhstani ice hockey defencemen
Avtomobilist Karagandy players
Avtomobilist Yekaterinburg players
Kazakhmys Satpaev players
Kazakhstani ice hockey coaches
Soviet ice hockey defencemen
Kazakhstan men's national ice hockey team coaches